Jundi-shapur University of Technology is located in Dezful, Iran. By the name of the northern branch of Ahwaz Shahid Chamran University it was established in 1976 and organizational chart with the four faculties of engineering, agriculture, science and medicine in an area of 18 hectares was approved. Because of the Iran-Iraq War the northern branch of Shahid Chamran educational activities were stopped.

Educational Activities of the northern branch of Shahid Chamran was begun in 1988 and students were accepted in the university to continue their education on the major of general works of the building (a branch of Civil engineering).

References

   3. http://en.jsu.ac.ir/  
   4. http://unesdoc.unesco.org/images/0025/002597/259732e.pdf

Education in Khuzestan Province
Universities in Iran